The RagWing RW1 Ultra-Piet is a family of single seat, parasol wing, single engine ultralight aircraft designed by Roger Mann and sold as plans by RagWing Aircraft Designs for amateur construction.

Design and development
The RW1 was designed as an FAR 103 Ultralight Vehicles compliant aircraft that would have an empty weight within that category's  empty weight limit. The RW1 was designed as a 3/4 scale ultralight version of the classic 1920s vintage Pietenpol Air Camper.

The airframe is constructed entirely from wood and covered with aircraft fabric. The landing gear is of conventional configuration and the wings are detachable. The Volkswagen air-cooled engine has been used, as well as the  Half VW and  2si 460.

Partial kits and construction kits were available in the late 1990s, but today the series are only offered as plans. Reported construction time is 300–500 hours.

The same basic airframe design was also used to produce the RW5 which is a replica of the Heath Parasol and the RW6 Rag-A-Muffin.

Variants
RW1 Ultra-Piet
Ultralight replica of the Pietenpol Air Camper.
RW5 Heath Replica
Full sized ultralight replica of the Heath Parasol, first flown in 1994.
RW6 Rag-A-Muffin (formerly the Sport Parasol)
Ultralight replica of the Pietenpol Air Camper for short and rough fields and with extra stowage, first flown in 1994.

Specifications (RW1)

See also

References

External links

Photo of RW1
Photo of RW6

1990s United States ultralight aircraft